Chahar Meleh-ye Olya (also romanized as Chahār Meleh-ye ‘Olyā; also known as Chahār Meleh-ye Akbar, Chahār Meleh-ye Bālā, and Chār Meleh-ye Akbar) is a village in Mansuri Rural District, Homeyl District, Eslamabad-e Gharb County, Kermanshah Province, Iran. At the 2006 census, its population was 58, in 16 families.

References 

Populated places in Eslamabad-e Gharb County